Ifan Evans is a Welsh rugby union player, for Newport RFC and the Wales 7's team. He previously played for Llandovery RFC .

He was selected in the Wales Sevens squad for 2012-13

References

External links 
 Llandovery RFC Profile

1983 births
Living people
Aberystwyth RFC players
Commonwealth Games rugby sevens players of Wales
Newport RFC players
Rugby sevens players at the 2010 Commonwealth Games
Rugby union players from Aberystwyth
Welsh rugby union players